St. Victor, or Saint Victor, is a Fransaskois community in the Rural Municipality of Willow Bunch No. 42. In 2006, it had a population of 43 people. It previously held the status of village until February 26, 2003. St. Victor is located 37 km south of the town of Assiniboia 10 km east of Highway 2. St. Victor Petroglyphs Provincial Park is two kilometres south of the community.

Demographics 

See also 
List of communities in Saskatchewan

References 

Designated places in Saskatchewan
Former villages in Saskatchewan
Unincorporated communities in Saskatchewan
Willow Bunch No. 42, Saskatchewan
Populated places disestablished in 2003
Division No. 3, Saskatchewan